Eric Cardouza (born 1965) is a retired British boxer.

Boxing career
He represented England and won a bronze medal in the 91 kg heavyweight division, at the 1986 Commonwealth Games in Edinburgh, Scotland.

Cardouza boxed for the Kingsthorpe ABC and won the ABA heavyweight championship in 1986.

References

1965 births
Living people
British male boxers
Commonwealth Games medallists in boxing
Boxers at the 1986 Commonwealth Games
Commonwealth Games bronze medallists for England
Heavyweight boxers
Medallists at the 1986 Commonwealth Games